John Laing Leal (May 5, 1858 – March 13, 1914) was an American physician and water treatment expert who, in 1908, was responsible for conceiving and implementing the first disinfection of a U.S. drinking water supply using chlorine. He was one of the principal expert witnesses at two trials which examined the quality of the water supply in Jersey City, New Jersey, and which evaluated the safety and utility of chlorine for production of "pure and wholesome" drinking water. The second trial verdict approved the use of chlorine to disinfect drinking water which led to an explosion of its use in water supplies across the U.S.

Early life and education
John L. Leal was born in Andes, New York, in 1858. In 1862, his father, John R. Leal who was a physician, joined the 144th New York Volunteer Infantry Regiment. John R. Leal saw service in a number of areas during the Civil War including Folly Island during the Siege of Charleston, South Carolina. He contracted a chronic case of amoebic dysentery (most likely from contaminated drinking water) at Folly Island from which he suffered for the next 19 years before the disease caused his death in 1882.

In 1867, Dr. John R. Leal moved his family from Andes to the rapidly growing industrial city of Paterson, New Jersey. John L. Leal received his primary education at the Paterson Seminary. He attended Princeton College (now Princeton University) from 1876 to 1880. John L. Leal attended medical school at the Columbia College of Physicians and Surgeons from 1880 to 1884 where he received his medical degree.

Career
After obtaining his medical degree, Leal opened a medical practice in Paterson, New Jersey, and was appointed City Physician in 1886. Along with other physicians, he founded the outpatient clinic at Paterson General Hospital in 1887 and worked there until 1892. In 1888, he married Amy Arrowsmith and their only son, Graham, was born within the year. Leal's career in Paterson city government continued with his appointment as Health Inspector in 1891 and Health Officer in 1892. As Health Officer, Leal was responsible for the identification of epidemics of communicable diseases and for the disinfection of the homes of the afflicted. He also oversaw the public water supply and was responsible for constructing the growing network of sewers to remove domestic and industrial wastes from the City. To prevent the spread of contagious diseases, he was responsible for building an Isolation Hospital in Paterson in 1897, which, at the time, was considered a model facility. By 1918, more than 1,000 North American cities were using chlorine to disinfect their water supplies, which served approximately 33 million people.

Statistics on the typhoid fever death rate in the U.S. showed a dramatic decrease in deaths due to this dreaded disease after the wide introduction of chlorine for disinfection. Filtration of water supplies contributed to the decrease in the typhoid fever death rate but chlorination is generally acknowledged as having a major impact on increased life expectancy in the U.S.

Unfortunately, Leal is seldom given credit for his pioneering work in the disinfection of drinking water. George A. Johnson was a plant operator and laboratory technician who worked on the chlorination plant at Boonton Reservoir. His later writings gave no credit to Leal and, by inference, Johnson took the credit for the decision to use chlorine on the Jersey City water supply. The record shows that Leal came up with the idea to disinfect the water supply of Jersey City and he should be given the credit for this major advance in public health.

On May 5, 2013, a number of people gathered at the gravesite of Leal in Paterson, New Jersey and dedicated a monument to him as a "Hero of Public Health." Present at the dedication were members of the New Jersey Section of the American Water Works Association and two great grandsons of Leal.

In August 2013, the American Water Works Association established a major annual award in honor of Leal. Entitled the Dr. John L. Leal Award, the purpose of the award is to recognize any individual, group, or organization that has made a notable and outstanding public health contribution to the water profession. The first award was given at the AWWA annual conference in June 2014 to Michael J. McGuire.

References

External links 
PBS Video on Development of Chlorine

Water Chlorination History
A Public Health Giant Step
Promoting Clean Water for Health
John L. Leal and public health
AWWA Water Industry Hall of Fame

1858 births
1914 deaths
Environmental health practitioners
Princeton University alumni
Physicians from New Jersey
Columbia University Vagelos College of Physicians and Surgeons alumni
People from Andes, New York
People from Paterson, New Jersey
American public health doctors